Loit may refer to:
Loit, a municipality in Schleswig-Holstein, Germany
Émilie Loit (born 1979), French professional female tennis player
Meelis Loit (born 1971), Estonian fencer

Estonian-language surnames